Reno station is an Amtrak intercity train station in Reno, Nevada, served by the California Zephyr train. It is also served by Amtrak Thruway Motorcoach routes to Sacramento.

Description

The station is located at 280 North Center Street in downtown Reno. The tracks are owned by the Union Pacific Railroad, while the station and platform are owned by the city of Reno. The station does not have a parking lot. The tracks are placed below ground level as they pass through the heart of downtown Reno. As of 2014, the station was served by the once-daily California Zephyr, running between Chicago and Emeryville, California (in the San Francisco Bay Area). The previous year, the station served 78,827 passengers, or about 216 per day. The station is popular with passengers traveling in both directions between Northern California and Reno.

Three Amtrak Thruway Motorcoach routes, two originating at the station and one at the Nugget Casino Resort in Sparks, connect the station to Sacramento.

History

A depot has existed at this location since the first transcontinental railroad arrived in Reno in 1868. A series of wooden depots built by the Central Pacific Railroad burned down. The current stucco depot was built by the Southern Pacific Railroad in 1926. The Southern Pacific Depot was also used by the Virginia & Truckee Railroad until 1950, when the railroad ceased operations. The Western Pacific Railroad historically provided service to Reno, but never used this station, instead using the (now disused for rail service) Nevada-California-Oregon Railroad Depot, a few blocks to the east.

ReTRAC

The station was enlarged in 2007 as part of the Reno Transportation Rail Access Corridor (ReTRAC) project, which grade separated the tracks to mostly eliminate street running in downtown Reno. In the process of excavating around the depot, many artifacts from Reno's past were discovered including a long filled-in pedestrian tunnel and a previously unknown basement at a former masonic lodge. Many items from the excavation are on display in the station lobby, including an old cistern used by the fire department, a horse watering fountain, Native American artifacts, and several bottles dating as far back as the 1860s. As part of the renovation, Amtrak moved most of its operations to a glass-enclosed addition near the trench, though passengers can still use the original waiting area.

On December 4, 2012, it was announced that the station would be placed on the National Register of Historic Places.

See also
 Nevada-California-Oregon Railroad Depot – former Western Pacific Reno station

Notes

References

External links

Reno Amtrak Station TrainWeb
ReTRAC Project City of Reno

Amtrak stations in Nevada
Buildings and structures in Reno, Nevada
Transportation in Reno, Nevada
Railway stations in the United States opened in 1926
Former Southern Pacific Railroad stations in Nevada
History of Reno, Nevada
National Register of Historic Places in Reno, Nevada
Railway stations on the National Register of Historic Places in Nevada
Railway stations in the United States opened in 1868